Anak Agung Ngurah Oka Ratmadi (born in Denpasar on 2 November 1945), commonly known as Cok Rat, was the regent of Badung Regency, Bali, Indonesia from 1999 to 2005, and currently a member of the Regional Representative Council (DPD) from Bali since 2014. He was nominated for the Governor of Bali in 2003, but he withdrew. He is the great-grandson of I Gusti Ngurah Made Agung, a National Hero of Indonesia who fought against the Dutch. He has three children, the second one, AA Krisna Yoga, died on 7 March 2016.

References

Mayors and regents of places in Bali
People from Badung Regency
Indonesian Hindus
1945 births
Living people
Bali
Balinese people
People from Denpasar
Regents of places in Indonesia